Joackim Andreas Olsen Solberg (born 11 April 1989) is a Norwegian footballer who plays as a defender for Mjøndalen .

Olsen Solberg was born in Krokstadelva.

Career
Olsen Solberg made his debut for Mjøndalen in 2008. He transferred to Sandefjord in 2016 after 8 years at Mjøndalen. In the summer of 2018 Olsen Solberg went back to Mjøndalen.

Career statistics

Club

References

Norwegian footballers
Mjøndalen IF players
Eliteserien players
Norwegian First Division players
Sandefjord Fotball players
1989 births
Living people
People from Nedre Eiker
Association football defenders
Sportspeople from Viken (county)